Cameron Clark (born 20 March 1993), commonly referred to as Cam, is an Australian rugby player currently with the San Diego Legion of the Major League Rugby (MLR). His regular playing positions are Wing, Centre and Fullback.

Clark is a former rugby sevens player having represented Australia at the World Rugby Sevens Series (2012–2016), 2013 Rugby World Cup Sevens, 2014 Commonwealth Games and the 2016 Summer Olympics. 

Clark has been with the Waratahs since 2017, playing mostly as centre and wing.

Personal life
Clark was born in Auckland, New Zealand to an Australian father, Greg, and a New Zealand mother. Clark moved to Australia when he was four years old. His father is a journalist and commentator for Fox Sports Australia.

Clark attended Macquarie University on a sports scholarship.

Rugby career

Rugby sevens
Clark began his professional rugby career in rugby sevens. He made his debut in the IRB Sevens Series in 2012 at the New Zealand leg of the competition. In 2014, he appeared for Australia in all six matches played at the 2014 Commonwealth Games, scoring forty-six points in total (three tries, thirteen conversions), and finishing with a bronze medal.

Clark was a member of the Australia squad during the 2013 Rugby World Cup Sevens. He was named as a member of the Australian team in the 2016 Summer Olympics. He scored one try against Spain in the Pool Stage.

Waratahs
In August 2016, Clark signed a two-year-deal with the New South Wales Waratahs, after playing most of his career in sevens rugby. He made his Super Rugby debut in round 3 of the 2017 Super Rugby season, coming on as a substitute for inside centre Irae Simone in the 41st minute. Clark's first try for the Waratahs in the Super Rugby came in round 9 of the season in an upset loss to the Southern Kings at home, 24–26.

In November 2019, Clark re-signed with the Waratahs to remain with the club for another season.

San Diego Legion
In December 2019, Clark signed for Major League Rugby (MLR) Western Conference team, San Diego Legion for the 2021 season.

References

External links
 
 
 
 

Living people
1993 births
Australian rugby union players
Commonwealth Games rugby sevens players of Australia
Male rugby sevens players
Australia international rugby sevens players
Rugby sevens players at the 2016 Summer Olympics
Olympic rugby sevens players of Australia
Commonwealth Games medallists in rugby sevens
Commonwealth Games bronze medallists for Australia
Rugby sevens players at the 2014 Commonwealth Games
Rugby union centres
Rugby union wings
Sydney (NRC team) players
New South Wales Waratahs players
San Diego Legion players
ACT Brumbies players
Medallists at the 2014 Commonwealth Games